Thomas or Tom Darnell may refer to:

 Thomas August Darnell (born 1950), American musician
 Sir Thomas Darnell, 1st Baronet (died 1638), 17th Century English Baronet
 Thomas Darnell (artist) (born 1958), American artist